The sixth season of the HBO supernatural drama series True Blood premiered on June 16, 2013. The season had an abbreviated run of ten episodes, as opposed to the usual twelve, partially to accommodate the pregnancy of lead actress Anna Paquin. It is also the first season not to be primarily based on the corresponding novel in The Southern Vampire Mysteries series (in this case Definitely Dead), instead taking elements from multiple books in the series.

Cast and characters

Main cast 

 Anna Paquin as Sookie Stackhouse
 Stephen Moyer as Bill Compton
 Sam Trammell as Sam Merlotte
 Ryan Kwanten as Jason Stackhouse
 Rutina Wesley as Tara Thornton
 Alexander Skarsgård as Eric Northman
 Chris Bauer as Andy Bellefleur
 Kristin Bauer van Straten as Pam Swynford De Beaufort
 Lauren Bowles as Holly Cleary
 Anna Camp as Sarah Newlin
 Nelsan Ellis as Lafayette Reynolds
 Lucy Griffiths as Nora Gainesborough
 Rutger Hauer as Niall Brigant
 Arliss Howard as Governor Truman Burrell 
 Rob Kazinsky as Ben Flynn / Macklyn Warlow
 Todd Lowe as Terry Bellefleur
 Joe Manganiello as Alcide Herveaux 
 Michael McMillian as Steve Newlin 
 Kelly Overton as Rikki Naylor 
 Robert Patrick as Jackson Herveaux
 Carrie Preston as Arlene Fowler Bellefleur
 Jurnee Smollett-Bell as Nicole Wright
 Deborah Ann Woll as Jessica Hamby

Special guest cast 

 Dale Dickey as  Martha Bozeman
 Adina Porter as Lettie Mae Daniels
 Janina Gavankar as Luna Garza

Guest cast 

 Amelia Rose Blaire as Willa Burrell
 Bailey Noble as 18–Year–Old Faerie #4 / Adilyn Bellefleur
 Chloe East as 11-Year-Old Faerie Girl #3
 Karolina Wydra as Violet Mazurski
 Luke Grimes as James Kent
 John Fleck as Dr. Overlark
 Jamie Gray Hyder as Danielle
 Chloe Noelle as Emma Garza
 Marque Richardson as Kenneth
 Pruitt Taylor Vince as Finn
 Keone Young as Hido Takahashi
 Jeffrey Nicholas Brown as Corbett Stackhouse
 Tara Buck as Ginger
 Jessica Clark as Lilith
 Matt Cook as Jessie
 Courtney Ford as Portia Bellefleur
 Aaron Howles as Rocky Cleary
 Noah Matthews as Wade Cleary
 John Rezig as Deputy Kevin Ellis
 Jenni Blong as Michelle Stackhouse
 Shaun Brown as Bruce
 Gregg Daniel as Reverend Daniels
 Jessy Hodges as Mustard
 Helen Slayton-Hughes as Caroline Bellefleur
 Valarie Pettiford as Mary Wright
 Tamlyn Tomita as Ms. Suzuki
 Patricia Bethune as Jane Bodehouse
 Giles Matthey as Claude Crane
 Hal Ozsan as King Charles II
 John Prosky as David Finch
 Dale Raoul as Maxine Fortenberry
 Haley Brooke Walker as Crystal
 Jude B. Lanston as Camp Sex Vampire
 Geovanni Gopradi as Finch's Detail Guy

Episodes

Production 
In February 2012 series creator Alan Ball announced he would step down as day-to-day showrunner of True Blood but would stay on as executive producer. Mark Hudis, who joined the writing staff at the beginning of the fourth season, was chosen as executive producer for season six. However, the producers announced in March 2013 that, after only a single season, Hudis would also depart the series to focus on developing his own HBO series. Brian Buckner filled the position for the rest of the season and will continue in the role for the seventh season. On Monday, July 15, 2013, HBO renewed True Blood for a seventh and final season.

Ratings

References 

2013 American television seasons
True Blood